Cornaa Halt (Manx: Stadd Cornaa) is an intermediate stopping place on the northern section of the Manx Electric Railway on the Isle of Man.

Location
The stop is in the parish of Maughold, about halfway between Laxey and Ramsey. It is a short distance away from the previous halt at Ballaglass Glen, but has road access unlike the latter.

Facilities
There is a typical Manx Electric Railway style waiting hut here that was refurbished by the Manx Electric Railway Society in 2003 and the station also has a post box, a remnant of the times when the company held the contract for mail collection; this ceased in 1975.

Glen
The halt serves the glen of the same name which is a short walk from the stopping place; the proximity of the glen is such that this is a popular stopping off place for walkers who can meander through the glen to the nearby beach.

Route

Also
Manx Electric Railway Stations

References

Sources
 Manx Electric Railway Stopping Places (2002) Manx Electric Railway Society
 Island Images: Manx Electric Railway Pages (2003) Jon Wornham
 Official Tourist Department Page (2009) Isle Of Man Heritage Railways

Railway stations in the Isle of Man
Manx Electric Railway
Railway stations opened in 1899